Aliphera is a genus of planthoppers in the family Fulgoridae.

References 

Auchenorrhyncha genera
Poiocerinae